Zalman Reisen (6 October 1887 – 1940), sometimes spelled Zalman Reyzen, was a lexicographer and literary historian of Yiddish literature.

Early life

Reisen was born in Koydenev (now known as Dzyarzhynsk) in Minsk Governorate (in present-day Belarus) in 1887 to parents interested in the Jewish Enlightenment, or Haskalah.  His father wrote poems in Hebrew and Yiddish.  His brother, Avrom Reyzen, was a noted Yiddish author and poet.  His sister, Sarah Reisen, was also active in Yiddish culture, particularly the Yiddish Writers and Journalists Union of Vilna.  He was educated at home, at several different cheders in the area, and attended a Russian state school in Minsk. In 1915, he moved to Vilna, where he would become an active part of the Yiddish intellectual scene as a writer and publisher.

Work
In 1914, Reisen began to work for the Fraind newspaper in Warsaw. From 1916 to 1918 he was an editor for the Letzte Naies in Vilna, and from 1919 he worked for the Wilner Tog.  After founder Shmuel Niger left for America, Reisen took over as chief editor and developed the paper into an important forum for discussion of cultural and societal questions of Judaism.

Leksikon

Reisen's most notable achievement was the publication of the Leksikon fun der yidisher literatur, prese, un filologye, (Vilna: 1926-1929).  This reference work centralized biographical and bibliographical information on Yiddish writers, providing an invaluable resource to scholars.  He gathered information through an ambitious campaign of questionnaires published in newspapers and through word of mouth, in an era of unreliable communication.  He continuously refined and improved his work, including more and more writers and improving the accuracy of the information through the years.  This work served as the basis for the Leksikon fun der nayer yidisher literatur, which remains one of the definitive reference works in the field.

YIVO

In February 1925, Reisen organized a conference with Max Weinreich to discuss Nochum Shtif's recent call for a Yiddish institute of higher education.  The conference enthusiastically endorsed the idea, and that date is generally accepted as the founding moment of YIVO.  Reisen would remain active in the organization, acting as an editor of its scholarly journal, the YIVO-bleter, from 1931 to 1939, and mentoring students in its Aspirantur program, which provided advanced graduate training to students of Jewish studies.  He traveled to the United States in 1930 and to Argentina in 1932 to raise money and support for the organization.

Fate
Despite being pro-Soviet in inclination, he was arrested by the Soviet occupiers in Autumn of 1939, shortly after the Soviet Union had invaded Poland and Lithuania as a result of the Molotov-Ribbentrop Pact.  His fate after this point was unknown, though it was claimed that he was shot by the Soviets in 1941.

References

Leksikon fun der nayer yidisher literatur, vol. 8.  New York: Congress for Jewish Culture, 1981.  478-482.
 Hirsz Abramowicz, “Zalmen Reyzen,” in Profiles of a Lost World: Memoirs of East European Jewish Life before World War II, pp. 313–320 (Detroit, 1999)
 Teitelbaum, Vanesa, "Mundo del idish y asociaciones culturales judías en Tucumán. Una reflexión a partir de la visita de Zalman Reisen en 1932", Cuadernos Judaicos. 2019

External links
Guide to the Collection of Yiddish Literature and Language at the YIVO Institute, New York, NY
Literature by and about Zalman Reisen in University Library JCS Frankfurt am Main: Digital Collections Judaica

1887 births
1940s deaths
Year of death uncertain
People from Dzyarzhynsk District
People from Minsky Uyezd
Belarusian Jews
Jewish historians
Yiddish culture in Russia
Linguists of Yiddish
History of YIVO
Belarusian people executed by the Soviet Union